Lewis Point is a point at the south side of the mouth of Anthony Glacier, on the east coast of Palmer Land, Antarctica. The point was photographed from the air by the United States Antarctic Service in 1940. During 1947 it was photographed from the air by the Ronne Antarctic Research Expedition (RARE) under Finn Ronne, who in conjunction with the Falkland Islands Dependencies Survey charted it from the ground. It was named by Ronne for Colonel Richard L. Lewis of the Army Quartermaster Corps, which furnished field equipment and clothing to the RARE for testing purposes.

References

Headlands of Palmer Land